Sarah-Jayne Blakemore  (born 11 August 1974) is Professor of Psychology and Cognitive Neuroscience at the University of Cambridge and co-director of the Wellcome Trust PhD Programme Neuroscience at University College London.

Education
Blakemore was born in Cambridge and educated at Oxford High School, England and the University of Oxford where she was a undergraduate student at St John's College, Oxford. She graduated with a Bachelor of Arts degree in experimental psychology in 1996. She completed postgraduate study at University College London where she was awarded a PhD in 2000 for research co-supervised by Daniel Wolpert and Chris Frith.

Research and career
After her PhD, she was appointed an international postdoctoral research fellow from 2001 to 2003 to work in Lyon, France, with Jean Decety on the perception of causality in the human brain. This was followed by a Royal Society Dorothy Hodgkin Fellowship (2004–2007) and then a Royal Society University Research Fellowship (2007–2013) at UCL. She is actively involved in increasing the public awareness of science, frequently gives public lectures and talks at schools and acted as scientific consultant on the BBC series The Human Mind in 2003. Blakemore has an interest in the links between neuroscience and education and co-wrote a book with Uta Frith on The Learning Brain: Lessons for Education. She co-directs the Wellcome Trust four Year PhD Programme in Neuroscience at UCL and serves as editor-in-Chief of the journal Developmental Cognitive Neuroscience.

Blakemore's research covers the development of social cognition and decision-making during human adolescence. She serves on the Royal Society BrainWaves working group for neuroscience and vision committee for mathematics education and science education.

Awards and honours
Blakemore has been awarded prizes including the British Psychological Society Doctoral Award 2001, the British Psychological Society Spearman Medal for outstanding early career research 2006, the Lecturer Award 2011 by the Swedish Neuropsychology Society and the Young Mind & Brain Prize from the University of Turin in 2013.

Blakemore was awarded the Royal Society's Rosalind Franklin Award in 2013 and the Klaus J. Jacobs Research Prize in 2015. Blakemore held a prestigious Royal Society University Research Fellowship from 2007 to 2013. In March 2015 Blakemore was interviewed by Jim Al-Khalili on BBC Radio 4's The Life Scientific.

In July 2018 Blakemore was elected Fellow of the British Academy (FBA). The British Psychological Society awarded Blakemore the Presidents' Award for Distinguished Contributions to Psychological Knowledge in August 2018 which provides a lifetime membership to the Society.  Blakemore was the winner of the 2018 Royal Society Prize for Science Books for her book Inventing Ourselves: The Secret Life of the Teenage Brain. She won Suffrage Science award in 2011. She was elected a Fellow of the Academy of Medical Sciences (FMedSci) in 2022.

Personal life
Blakemore is the daughter of Colin Blakemore and Andrée Blakemore (née Washbourne). She has two sons.

References

1974 births
Living people
People educated at Oxford High School, England
Academics of University College London
Royal Society University Research Fellows
Blakemore, S
British women scientists
Alumni of St John's College, Oxford
British neuroscientists
British women neuroscientists
Fellows of the British Academy
Fellows of the Royal Society of Biology
People associated with The Institute for Cultural Research